This is a list of mayors of the city of Zug, Switzerland. The executive of Zug is the Stadtrat. It is chaired by the Stadtpräsident. 

Zug
 
Zug
Lists of mayors (complete 1900-2013)